Michael James Hugh Alison (27 June 1926 – 28 May 2004) was a British Conservative politician.

Born in Margate, Kent, Alison was educated at Eton College; Wadham College, Oxford; and Ridley Hall, Cambridge. During the war, he served in the Coldstream Guards. He was a councillor on Kensington Borough Council from 1956 to 1959 and a research worker on foreign affairs at the Conservative Research Department from 1958 to 1964.

He served as Member of Parliament for Barkston Ash from the 1964 general election until that constituency was abolished for the 1983 general election, and then for the constituency of Selby which replaced it, from 1983 until he stood down at the 1997 general election.

He held various junior ministerial posts under Margaret Thatcher, including serving as her Parliamentary Private Secretary (1983–87) and as a Minister of State (Northern Ireland Office 1979–81, Department of Employment 1981–83). For ten years from 1987 he was the Second Church Estates Commissioner.

Family
In 1958 he married Sylvia Haigh, with whom he had two sons and a daughter. His son, James, is a noted Christian theologian and advocate of the acceptance of homosexuals in the Church.

References

External links
 

1926 births
2004 deaths
Military personnel from Kent
Conservative Party (UK) MPs for English constituencies
Members of the Privy Council of the United Kingdom
People educated at Eton College
Members of Kensington Metropolitan Borough Council
Councillors in the Royal Borough of Kensington and Chelsea
Alumni of Wadham College, Oxford
UK MPs 1964–1966
UK MPs 1966–1970
UK MPs 1970–1974
UK MPs 1974
UK MPs 1974–1979
UK MPs 1979–1983
UK MPs 1983–1987
UK MPs 1987–1992
UK MPs 1992–1997
Northern Ireland Office junior ministers
Church Estates Commissioners
Parliamentary Private Secretaries to the Prime Minister
British Army personnel of World War II
Coldstream Guards soldiers